Charles Arthur Akers (July 12, 1939 – June 30, 2016) was an American biathlete. He competed in the 20 km individual event at the 1964 Winter Olympics.

Akers grew up in Andover, Maine, attended the University of Maine, and retired to Palmer, Alaska after his athletics career, becoming a member of the National Ski Patrol.

References

External links
 

1939 births
2016 deaths
American male biathletes
American male cross-country skiers
Olympic biathletes of the United States
Olympic cross-country skiers of the United States
Biathletes at the 1964 Winter Olympics
Cross-country skiers at the 1960 Winter Olympics
People from Rumford, Maine
20th-century American people